The 1951 NBA World Championship Series was the championship round of the 1951 NBA Playoffs, which concluded the National Basketball Association 1950–51 season. The Western Division champion Rochester Royals faced the Eastern Division champion New York Knicks in a best-of-seven series with Rochester having home-court advantage.

Rochester won the first three games, two at home, but New York won the next three, two at home. It was the first BAA or NBA Finals (spanning 1947 to 1951) that extended to a seventh-game conclusion, a 4-point win by Rochester at home on Saturday, April 21.

The seven games were played in fifteen days, beginning Saturday and Sunday, April 7 and 8, in Rochester and incorporating one game in Rochester on each following weekend. Three Wednesday or Friday games were played in New York City. The entire postseason tournament spanned 33 days in which both Rochester and New York played 14 games.

The Royals appeared in their first NBA finals by defeating the Fort Wayne Pistons in the semifinals and the two-time defending champion Minneapolis Lakers in the division finals while the Knicks defeated the Boston Celtics in the semifinals and the Syracuse Nationals in the division finals. This was the first finals appearance for both teams, and the first Finals with two teams that had not made a finals appearance since the 1947 BAA Finals.

Series summary

Royals win series 4–3

The Rochester / Cincinnati Royals / Kansas City / Sacramento Kings won their first ever NBA Championship.

Aftermath
This was the first and to date last title for the Rochester Royals, who would move to Cincinnati for the 1957–58 NBA season. The Royals would spend 15 years mired in mediocrity before moving to Kansas City in 1972, changing their name in the process to the Kings. One notable highlight was their appearance in the 1981 NBA Playoffs, in which their 40-42 team reached the Conference Finals before losing to the Houston Rockets who also had a 40-42 record. The Kings moved to Sacramento in 1985. The team reached the conference finals in the 2002 NBA Playoffs, their closest to reaching the NBA finals in recent years. The Royals/Kings have the longest NBA title drought, and also the longest Finals appearance drought in NBA history and actively in all of the American major four pro sports leagues.

This would be the Knicks first of three consecutive appearances in the Finals, but they would lose all three times. They would not return to the Finals until 1970, which they won.

Notes

References

External links
 1951 Finals at NBA.com
 1951 NBA Playoffs at Basketball-Reference.com

National Basketball Association Finals
Finals
Rochester Royals
NBA
NBA Finals
NBA Finals
Sports competitions in New York City
Sports in Rochester, New York
NBA Finals
1950s in Manhattan
Rose Hill, Manhattan
Events in Rochester, New York